Starousmanovo (İśke Uśman) is a rural locality (a village) in Balyshlinsky Selsoviet, Blagovarsky District, Bashkortostan, Russia. The population was 72 as of 2010. There are 2 streets.

Geography 
Starousmanovo is located 28 km south of Yazykovo (the district's administrative centre) by road. Novy Bulyak is the nearest rural locality.

References 

Rural localities in Blagovarsky District